Keve Aluma (born December 31, 1998) is an American professional basketball player who currently plays for Niigata Albirex BB. He previously played for the Virginia Tech Hokies and the Wofford Terriers.

Early life and high school career
Aluma grew up playing soccer and did not play basketball until high school. He stood 6'7" as a freshman at Stephen Decatur High School in Berlin, Maryland. Aluma was a three-year starter for Decatur, leading the team to two regional titles and a 3A state championship game appearance. He was named Bayside South Player of the Year in his senior season. Aluma committed to playing college basketball for Wofford over offers from Loyola (Maryland), UTEP and UMBC, among others.

College career
Aluma averaged 2.5 points and 3.4 rebounds per game as a freshman at Wofford. He became a starter in his next season. On January 3, 2019, Aluma matched his season-high 14 points and nine rebounds in a 112–81 win over The Citadel. As a sophomore, he averaged 6.9 points and 6.8 rebounds per game. Aluma transferred to Virginia Tech, where his previous coach Mike Young was hired, and sat out for one season due to transfer rules. 

On November 28, 2020, he posted 23 points and eight rebounds in an 81–73 overtime win over third-ranked Villanova. On January 30, 2021, he recorded 29 points, 10 rebounds and four assists, leading his team to a 65–61 win over eighth-ranked Virginia. In his following game, Aluma posted 30 points, 10 rebounds and five assists in an 83–72 loss to Pittsburgh. As a redshirt junior, Aluma averaged 15.2 points and 7.9 rebounds per game, earning Second Team All-ACC honors. Following the season, he declared for the 2021 NBA draft, but ultimately returned for his senior season. Aluma was again named to the Second Team All-ACC as a senior.

Career statistics

College

|-
| style="text-align:left;"| 2017–18
| style="text-align:left;"| Wofford
| 33 || 3 || 13.3 || .566 || – || .571 || 3.4 || .5 || .2 || .4 || 2.5
|-
| style="text-align:left;"| 2018–19
| style="text-align:left;"| Wofford
| 35 || 34 || 26.6 || .667 || .000 || .574 || 6.8 || 1.0 || .7 || .9 || 6.9
|-
| style="text-align:left;"| 2019–20
| style="text-align:left;"| Virginia Tech
| style="text-align:center;" colspan="11"|  Redshirt
|-
| style="text-align:left;"| 2020–21
| style="text-align:left;"| Virginia Tech
| 22 || 22 || 30.6 || .490 || .351 || .722 || 7.9 || 2.2 || .7 || 1.3 || 15.2
|- class="sortbottom"
| style="text-align:center;" colspan="2"| Career
| 90 || 59 || 22.7 || .556 || .345 || .639 || 5.8 || 1.1 || .5 || .8 || 7.3

Personal life
His biological father, Peter Aluma, played in the National Basketball Association (NBA) for part of one season. He was raised by his mother and stepfather, Bethany and Bruce Copeland.

References

External links
Virginia Tech Hokies bio
Wofford Terriers bio

1998 births
Living people
American men's basketball players
American sportspeople of Nigerian descent
Basketball players from Maryland
People from Berlin, Maryland
Power forwards (basketball)
Virginia Tech Hokies men's basketball players
Wofford Terriers men's basketball players